Michael Steven López (born 19 August 1997) is an Argentine professional footballer who plays as a centre-forward for Moldovan club Sheriff Tiraspol.

Career
López first appeared in the first-team of Argentine Primera División side Banfield in May 2017, as an unused substitute for a Copa Argentina match against Chaco For Ever. On 14 October, López made his professional debut in the Primera División against Estudiantes, coming on as a late substitute for Darío Cvitanich. After a second appearance versus Colón two weeks later, López made his first start in a league match with San Lorenzo on 4 November. His first senior goal arrived on 18 July 2018 in a Copa Argentina round of sixty-four defeat against General Lamadrid of Primera C Metropolitana.

Ahead of January 2019, López was loaned out to Primera B Nacional's Defensores de Belgrano. Seven appearances followed in six months. July 2019 saw López agree a loan move to Fénix. He debuted in a defeat away to Almirante Brown on 3 August, which preceded his first goal coming in September against Flandria. He returned to Banfield in June 2020, as he subsequently trained with their reserves. On 6 March 2021, López headed to Belarus with Premier League side Minsk. He debuted in a cup quarter-final first leg draw with Isloch later that day.

On 13 December 2021, he signed with AC Oulu in Finland. On 2 February 2023, he signed with Moldovan side Sheriff Tiraspol.

Career statistics
.

References

External links

1997 births
Living people
People from Lomas de Zamora
Argentine footballers
Association football forwards
Club Atlético Banfield footballers
Defensores de Belgrano footballers
Club Atlético Fénix players
FC Minsk players
AC Oulu players
FC Sheriff Tiraspol players
Argentine Primera División players
Primera Nacional players
Argentine expatriate footballers
Expatriate footballers in Belarus
Expatriate footballers in Finland
Expatriate footballers in Moldova
Argentine expatriate sportspeople in Belarus
Argentine expatriate sportspeople in Finland
Argentine expatriate sportspeople in Moldova
Sportspeople from Buenos Aires Province